Edward Cathal Byrne (born 16 April 1972) is an Irish actor and comedian. He has presented the British television shows Just for Laughs and Uncut! Best Unseen Ads, has been a guest on numerous television panel games and has appeared on a number of television cooking shows.

Early life
Byrne was born on 16 April 1972 in Swords, County Dublin, Ireland, to Jill and Eddie Byrne, the third of four children.

Career

Stand-up comedy
Deciding to study horticulture at the University of Strathclyde in Glasgow, he was made entertainments convener at the Students' Union in his second year of study. Byrne started a comedy night called The Comedy Cellar in the basement of the 13th Note public house on Glassford Street, Glasgow. On the first night, Byrne appeared on the roster alongside Armando Iannucci's brother David. Over the following few months, acts booked included Ford Kiernan, Phil Kay, Greg Hemphill, Alan Francis and Alan Tyler. After a few months he gave up studying and headed to London. He was later booked to appear at The Comedy Cellar by new convenors Ford Kiernan and J.P. Leach.

After building up his act on observational comedy, Byrne was nominated for the prestigious Perrier Comedy Award at the 1998 Edinburgh Festival Fringe.

In 2006 he toured the UK, recording a DVD in Leeds, entitled Pedantic and Whimsical, which was largely a "greatest hits" set of his material to date. He has also appeared in Father Ted, and performed voice-over work in the Carphone Warehouse adverts. In February 2007 Byrne appeared on a comedians' special edition of Weakest Link. Byrne has performed eight sell-out shows at the Edinburgh Festival Fringe and four sell-out UK tours. He has also developed huge success on the international circuit where he has performed to full capacity audiences in Canada, France, Australia, New Zealand and the United States.

He has since garnered a raft of major broadcast credits, including five U.S. appearances on Late Night with Conan O'Brien (NBC). In July 2007, Byrne made his début at the Newbury Comedy Festival, having participated in the Cat Laughs Comedy Festival in Kilkenny shortly before. He recorded a live DVD Different Class at the King's Theatre, Glasgow, on 23 March 2009, which was released on 23 November of that year.

On 15 September 2010, Byrne, along with 54 other public figures, signed an open letter published in The Guardian, stating their opposition to Pope Benedict XVI's state visit to the UK.

Byrne frequently appeared on BBC stand-up comedy programme Mock the Week as the most common guest panellist, having appeared on 73 episodes as of October 2022.

Television work
Byrne's earliest TV appearances included the ITV shows The Big Big Talent Show and Blind Date. He also appeared in Father Ted as a teenager mocking Father Ted and two other priests on a phone chat line, in the episode "A Christmassy Ted". Byrne has presented television shows Uncut! Best Unseen Ads and Just for Laughs, and is a regular guest on The Panel, HeadJam, Mock the Week and Never Mind the Buzzcocks. He has also appeared on Lily Savage's Blankety Blank, Have I Got News for You, The Bubble, The Unbelievable Truth, Bring Me the Head of Light Entertainment and We Need Answers. He has also appeared on The Graham Norton Show six times.

Byrne featured in a series of comedy shorts on the MSN Video Channel in which he discusses some of his pet hates, including occasional smokers and his girlfriend's snoring. On 31 March 2012, Byrne appeared on All Star Family Fortunes.

On 5 July 2012, Byrne appeared as a guest on The One Show. Byrne presented segments during Volcano Live from 9 to 12 July. He appeared on a celebrity version of The Chase on 30 November 2013, where he successfully brought £117,000 through, a record for the programme. Dara and Ed's Great Big Adventure, a 2015 three-part fly-on-the-wall television series, followed Byrne and Dara Ó Briain (fellow Irish comedian and best friend) in their journey by car down the Pan-American Highway.

In January 2013 Byrne was a contestant on episode 4 of BBC's The Great Comic Relief Bake Off and won the Technical Challenge with his lemon meringue pie. In January 2014 he hosted episode 4 of The Great Sport Relief Bake Off on BBC Two.

In January and February 2021 he was a contestant on BBC's Celebrity Best Home Cook. Describing his signature dish, smoked pork ribs, Byrne said, "I cover them in a dry rub that I've been perfecting by trial and error for years, then shove them in a barrel smoker for about 10 hours, spraying them with apple juice and cider to keep them moist." Byrne was described as "a reasonably strong participant" and was named as one of the judges' favourites in episode two. He was eliminated, along with Karim Zeroual, in episode five, on 8 February.

Acting
Byrne played the title character in the 2000 ITV adaptation of the pantomime Aladdin and had a small part in the 2000 comedy film Rat. In 2001 Byrne was the main character in an RTÉ-produced sitcom entitled The Cassidys. It was cancelled after one series.

In 2005 he starred in the film, . The film is about John Davies (played by Byrne) who suffers from multiple obsessive compulsive disorders. When his current model girlfriend leaves him, he decides to replace her with the most attractive woman on the planet, Czech model . The film follows his attempts to curb his old obsessions to meet his latest obsession – Veronika.

Byrne played the part of Luke Dyson in a comedy film set in London called Are You Ready For Love for which he won an Angel award at the Monaco Film Festival as best supporting actor.

Byrne plays the part of Irish radio presenter Dylan Dale in the British feature film version of Tony Hawks' book Round Ireland with a Fridge which was released in September 2010 and on DVD on 8 November 2010.

In 2010, Byrne played Rob in the BBC television pilot Reunited.

Writing
Since 2011, Byrne has written a column for the hillwalking magazine TGO in which he tries a different outdoor activity each month in the company of an expert. He also had a column in the Metro newspaper until January 2012.

Personal life
Byrne believes his older brother Stephen was the funniest member of the family as a child. His younger brother Paul was a comedy director and had long been a fixture at the Edinburgh Festival Fringe.

Byrne married theatre publicist Claire Walker in 2008. The couple live in Essex and have two sons, the elder called Cosmo and the younger named Magnus. Fellow comic Dara Ó Briain was best man at his wedding, returning the favour after Byrne was previously Ó Briain's best man in 2006.

On 12 February 2022, Byrne announced via his Twitter account that his younger brother Paul had died aged 44 years old. He also has an older sister, Trish.

Byrne is an atheist and a patron of Humanists UK.

Works

Tours

Comedy specials

Ed Venturing

Filmography

Film

Television

Radio shows

Books
 Sit-Down Comedy (contributor to anthology, eds. Malcolm Hardee & John Fleming) Ebury Press/Random House, 2003.  ;

References

External links

 
 

1972 births
Living people
20th-century Irish comedians
20th-century Irish male actors
21st-century Irish comedians
21st-century Irish male actors
Alumni of the University of Strathclyde
Irish expatriates in the United Kingdom
Irish atheists
Irish male comedians
Irish male film actors
Irish male television actors
Irish stand-up comedians
Male actors from Dublin (city)
People from Swords, Dublin